Estádio Olímpico Nilton Santos is a multi-purpose stadium located in the neighbourhood of Engenho de Dentro in Rio de Janeiro, Brazil. It is used mostly for football matches and athletics and is the home stadium of the football club Botafogo. The stadium was built by a consortium under the leadership of Odebrecht S.A., from 2003 through to 2007, opening in time for the 2007 Pan American Games. It hosted the athletics competitions at the 2016 Summer Olympics and the 2016 Summer Paralympics. It was one of the five venues for the 2021 Copa América.

The stadium is known by a number of names. The nickname Engenhão refers to the location of the stadium. The stadium was named after former FIFA president and International Olympic Committee (IOC) member João Havelange (1916–2016). Havelange died after an attack of pneumonia during the 2016 Olympics at age 100. Between 2015 and 2017 the Rio municipality allowed Botafogo to refer to the stadium as Estádio Nilton Santos (English: Nilton Santos Stadium). The name honors Nílton Santos, regarded as one of the greatest defenders in the history of the game and a member of the World Team of the 20th Century. Botafogo made initial efforts to have the name change official but this was not immediately successful. In February 2017, the city of Rio de Janeiro officially renamed the stadium Estádio Olímpico Nilton Santos. Structural problems in the roof were identified in March 2013 that caused the stadium to be closed for repair. The stadium's capacity was increased to 60,000 for the Games.

History

Construction and opening

The stadium cost  (US$192 million) to build, which was six times the stadium's original construction budget of R$60,000,000 The Mayor's office estimated in 2003 that the total construction cost would be of R$60 million (US$30 million); the actual cost was thus 533% higher than early estimates.

The stadium opened on 30 June 2007. The first match held was a Campeonato Brasileiro Série A game between Botafogo and Fluminense. 40,000 tickets were available for the match and were exchanged for donations of powdered milk. In all, 43,810 people were at the stadium to watch the inaugurating match, where Botafogo beat Fluminense 2–1. The first goal of the match was scored by Fluminense's Alex Dias. As Dias scored the first goal in the stadium's history, he was awarded the Valdir Pereira Trophy (Taça Valdir Pereira), which was named after retired footballer Didi. Because Botafogo won the stadium's inaugural match, the club was awarded the João Havelange Trophy (Taça João Havelange).

Pan American Games, Botafogo, and the Olympics

During the course of the 2007 Pan American Games held in Rio de Janeiro in July, the stadium hosted athletics competitions, in addition to twelve games of the first stage of the men's and women's football tournaments. After the conclusion of the games, on 3 August 2007, Botafogo de Futebol e Regatas signed a deal with the City of Rio de Janeiro to rent the stadium for 20 years. Botafogo was the only organization to present a bid; the club agreed to pay $18.200 (or R$36.000) a month to rent Engenhão, plus maintenance costs which run at $2 million (or R$4 million) annually. On 11 August 2007, a 15-meter long and 6-meter high stadium wall collapsed, but nobody was hurt. On 10 September 2008, the Brazilian national team played for the first time at the Engenhão. The match, against Bolivia, for 2010 World Cup Qualification, ended 0–0.

The stadium remains owned by the City of Rio de Janeiro, but it has been rented to Botafogo until at least 2027 (20 years). The Engenhão was the main venue for top football competitions in Rio de Janeiro while the Maracanã Stadium was being renovated in preparation for both the 2014 FIFA World Cup and 2016 Summer Olympics. Flamengo and Fluminense played their home matches at the Engenhão from the 2010–11 through 2012–13 seasons. The stadium was closed indefinitely in March 2013 after it was found the structural integrity of the roof was not up to standard, and could potentially place spectators at risk. It was announced on 8 June 2013, that the stadium would need a minimum of 18 months of reconstruction work and remain closed until 2015 while the repairs were carried out to the roof.

Concerts

Gallery

See also 

 History of Botafogo de Futebol e Regatas

References

External links

 Stadium 3D Original Project

Olimpico Joao Havelange
Sports venues in Rio de Janeiro (city)
Venues of the 2016 Summer Olympics
Olympic athletics venues
Olympic football venues
Olympic stadiums
Venues of the 2007 Pan American Games
Football venues in Rio de Janeiro (city)
Botafogo de Futebol e Regatas
Pan American Games athletics venues
Sports venues completed in 2007
Athletics in Rio de Janeiro (city)
2007 establishments in Brazil